Yugoslavia was present at the Eurovision Song Contest 1968, held in London, United Kingdom.

Before Eurovision

Jugovizija 1968 
The Yugoslav national final to select their entry, was held on 25 February at the RTV Skopje Studios in Skopje. There were six hosts in the contest; Vesna Nestorović, Kristina Remskar, Dubravka Ćećez, Snežana Lipkovska, Rosanda Kovijanić and Helga Vlahović. There were 15 songs in the final, from six subnational public broadcasters of  JRT.  RTV Titograd made a come-back, after their first participation in 1963 Yugoslav finals. The winner was chosen by the votes of a mixed jury of experts and citizens, one juror from each of the subnational public broadcasters of  JRT, and three non-experts - citizens. The winning song was "Jedan dan" performed by the Croatian group Dubrovački trubaduri, written by Stijepo Stražičić and composed by Đelo Jusić and Stipica Kalogjera. Lola Novaković represented Yugoslavia in Eurovision Song Contest 1962.

At Eurovision
Because groups weren't allowed at the ESC, Dubrovački trubaduri had to perform under the name of two of its singers - Luci Capurso & Hamo Hajdarhodžić. Dubrovački trubaduri performed 17th (last) on the night of the Contest, following Germany. At the close of the voting the song had received 8 points, coming 7th in the field of 17 competing countries.

Voting

Notes

References

External links
Eurodalmatia official ESC club
Eurovision Song Contest National Finals' Homepage
Eurovision France
ECSSerbia.com
OGAE North Macedonia

1968
Countries in the Eurovision Song Contest 1968
Eurovision